The Auckland Rugby League was in its 12th season.

On 25 March, North Shore Albions held a meeting to discuss whether they should amalgamate with Sunnyside League Football Club, who were also based in Devonport and had been in existence since 1914. The following week both clubs agreed to merge. After some debate they decided their club name would be 'Devonport United' and they would wear green and white broad bands. In addition Grafton and Richmond Rovers amalgamated, while new clubs were also formed in Kingsland (Kingsland Rovers), and at Point Chevalier.

First grade games continued to regularly draw large crowds, especially matches involving the likes of Maritime, City Rovers, and Ponsonby United. The round 6 match between Maritime and Ponsonby drew what was thought to be a record crowd for a club match in Auckland of 9,000. Maritime would go on to win the first grade title for the first time after a strong season where they won nine games and were only defeated twice. They were awarded the Monteith Shield at the 1921 annual general meeting while Newton Rangers won the Roope Rooster for the second year in a row by defeating Maritime in the final.

The highlight of the year was the match between Auckland and the touring England team on 24 July. A crowd of 30,000 packed into the Auckland Domain to witness an Auckland win by 24 points to 16.

Carlaw Park site found 
At the end of the season an inspection was made of the site where Carlaw Park would emerge. It was decided that the ground would be named ‘Carlaw Athletic Park’. The land had been purchased years earlier. It was noted that the site was “excellently situated for the purpose for which it is intended, and provides sufficient space for two playing grounds. Natural slopes on two sides will give room for a large number of spectators…”.

Monteith Shield (first grade championship)
Maritime won the first grade title with City Rovers finishing in second position. Three grounds were used for the competition, Victoria Park, the Auckland Domain, and the Devonport Domain. Thirty eight matches were played which was the most in the competitions history to this point. Unlike in previous seasons all clubs were able to survive until the end of the season and fulfill the majority, or all, of their fixture obligations.

Monteith Shield standings
{|
|-
|

(*) Two of Grafton's defeats were by default, while one of Marist's wins and one of Devonport's wins were by default.

Monteith Shield fixtures

Round 1
 Wally Somers scored for Newton in their win over Grafton.

Round 2

Round 3

Round 4

Round 5
The match between City and Grafton had the score reported by both the Auckland Star and the New Zealand Herald but had no match report and scoring. The Observer had a brief description of the match where they described one of Karl Ifwersen's "tries" indicating he scored at least 2.

Round 6
Arthur Cadman was sent off in the Maritime match versus Ponsonby for kicking a Maritime player, while the Auckland Star suggested in their match reports that the 9,000 in attendance was possibly the largest ever Auckland Club Rugby League crowd to attend a match to this point. Grafton defaulted their match against Devonport as Joe Bennett was injured, Karl Ifwersen was sick, Horace Neal had a "broken shoulder", and Owen, Moir, and Norton were out of town.

Round 7
2 Players were ordered off in the 2nd half of the Maritime versus Newton match. While in the Grafton v Ponsonby match Grafton had two players ordered off including Horace Neal, and had another injured meaning they finished the match with just 10 players on the field.

Round 8

Round 9

Round 10

Round 11
The City v Grafton match resulted in a 66–13 win to City but the Auckland Star and New Zealand Herald did not report any of the scoring details. Grafton were missing Karl Ifwersen, Joe Bennett, and Charles Woolley who were on representative duty and could only field 11 players.

Round 12

Round 13

Roope Rooster knockout competition
The Roope Rooster began on 28 August with 3 first round matches and Ponsonby United receiving a bye. Newton Rangers defeated Maritime in the final for the second consecutive year.

Round 1

Semi finals

Final

Top try scorers and point scorers
The following point scoring lists include Senior Championship matches and the Roope Rooster competition matches only. The lists are extremely incomplete for players from the City Rovers club who had no scoring whatsoever for their 24–17 win over Grafton Athletic, and their 66–13 win over the same opponents. In total the City team was missing the scorers of 112 of its points. Likewise Devonport United was missing scorers for 7 points, Newton Rangers for 13, Maritime for 3, Marist Old Boys for 15, and Grafton Athletic for 30 (from the two matches with City). In addition to this a number of teams featured brothers and often there was no distinction made as to which of the Grey brothers of Maritime it was. H Grey scored 4 tries, while C Grey was credited with 3, along with 2 conversions, however "Grey" was credited with 8 tries, 1 conversion, 1 penalty, and a drop goal which could have been either of the aforementioned players in each instance. Also Ponsonby had a try and conversion credited to McGregor but they could have been scored by either E McGregor or Dougie McGregor.

Bill Davidson replicated the feat of his younger brother George of the previous season by leading the point scoring while playing for Maritime. George had qualified for the Antwerp Olympics where he ran 5th in the 200m final and did not play in the Auckland Rugby League competition at all in 1920. He was to return and join his brothers in the City Rovers team from the 1921 season onwards.

Thacker Shield
Ponsonby United defended the Thacker Shield from Federal (of Christchurch) at Victoria Park in front of 10,000 spectators. They had won the shield from Sydenham in Christchurch two years earlier. They had been unable to arrange a defence in the 1919 season. Eventually the shield was to be returned to Christchurch and played for amongst teams in the South Island.

Other club matches and lower grades

Exhibition and benefit matches

Lower grade teams and clubs
There were 5 lower grades in 1920. Richmond and Grafton fielded a combined side in the 5th grade, though Richmond also fielded their own side in the same grade.

Point Chevalier fielded their first ever side in the Third Grade competition. They lost their first ever match to Devonport United (North Shore Albions) by 22 points to 6. Their only other reported results were a 21-7 loss to the same opponent in round 7 and a 14-2 loss in round 8 to Manukau.

Second Grade
The full results were not reported with just 18 reported and 38 not reported therefor the standings are very incomplete. City Rovers won the competition. Devonport United B withdrew after 7 rounds, Thames Old Boys withdrew after 10 rounds Marist and Mangere both withdrew after 11 rounds.
{|
|-
|

Third Grade
Manukau won their first ever grade title. The full results were not reported with only 8 scores published in the newspapers and 16 not published. Maritime withdrew after 4 rounds, and Newton Rangers withdrew after 5 rounds. Ellerslie United played a friendly match with Kingsland on September 25 when the season had finished.
{|
|-
|

Fourth Grade
Ponsonby United won the competition. There were 19 results reported and 20 not reported. The round 1 match between Kingsland and City was abandoned with the referee refusing to play the match due to the extremely poor standard of the field at the newly developed. Thirty shillings had been spent on clearing the ground prior. Maritime withdrew after just one round while Marist withdrew a week later. Northcote & Birkenhead withdrew following round 8, as did Devonport United. On August 28 Ellerslie (who were reforming) played a match against Grafton-Richmond, which they lost 10-6. On the same day City beat Ponsonby 43-0 in a knockout match. Knockout matches were played over the following 3 weeks but no results were reported.
{|
|-
|

Fifth Grade
Manukau won the competition and were undefeated in reported results (20-0, 17-0, 22-8, 9-3, 10-6, and 3-0). There were 17 results reported and 41 not reported. Northcote & Birkenhead withdrew after round 6 rounds, while both Ponsonby sides withdrew after 9 rounds. The round 9 match between Maritime and Grafton-Richmond was the curtain-raiser to the Auckland v England match.
{|
|-
|

Sixth Grade
Ponsonby won the championship, sealing it with their 5-0 win over Manukau on August 14. There were only 14 results reported with 18 not reported. The round 10 match between City Rovers and the combined Grafton-Richmond side on July 24 was a curtain-raiser to the Auckland v England match.
{|
|-
|

Representative fixtures
Auckland played a Rest of New Zealand team as part of the selection process for the New Zealand team to play England. They trounced them by 54 points to 0. They later played a trial match between and A and B team before the Auckland side was selected to play England. The match was played at the Auckland Domain in front of 30,000 spectators. Unfortunately the English halfback fractured his tibia in the first few minutes and they were forced to play with 12 for the remainder of the game as the rules at the time did not allow for substitutions of injured players.

Auckland v Rest of New Zealand
The match was postponed a day due to bad weather and played on the Sunday.

Auckland trial match

Auckland v England

Auckland representative matches played and scorers

References

External links
 Auckland Rugby League Official Site

Auckland Rugby League seasons
Auckland Rugby League